Seynou Loum (born 3 January 1972) is a Senegalese sprinter. He competed in the men's 4 × 100 metres relay at the 1992 Summer Olympics.

References

1972 births
Living people
Athletes (track and field) at the 1992 Summer Olympics
Senegalese male sprinters
Olympic athletes of Senegal
Place of birth missing (living people)